In audio engineering, a mix-minus or clean feed is a particular setup of a mixing console or matrix mixer, such that an output of the mixer contains everything except a designated input.  Mix-minus is often used to prevent echoes or feedback in broadcast or sound reinforcement systems.

Examples
A common situation in which a mix-minus is used is when a telephone hybrid is connected to a console, usually at a radio station.  The person on the telephone hears all relevant feeds, usually an identical mix to that of the master bus, including the DJ's mic feed, except that the caller does not hear their own voice.

Mix-minus is also often used together with IFB systems in electronic news gathering (ENG) for television news reporters and interview subjects speaking to a host from a remote outside broadcast (OB) location.  Because of the delay that is introduced in most means of transmission (including satellite feeds and audio over IP connections), the remote subject's voice has to be removed from their earpiece.  Otherwise, the subject would hear themselves with a slight (but very distracting) delay.

Another common example is in the field of sound reinforcement.  Consider a room with sound stations for multiple users, each station containing a microphone and a loudspeaker.  Such a room might be used in a government house of parliament.  The microphone in station #1 would feed the loudspeakers in every other station except station #1.  In other words, station #1 receives a mix of all microphones minus the station #1 microphone.  This enables all participants to hear each other clearly but minimizes problems with acoustic feedback.

Mix-minus is also used with VoIP communication when recording for podcasts:  mix-minus removes the caller's voice from the VoIP call, but allows them to hear all other channels available at the mixing console (mixer).

Some broadcast mixing desks, notably those designed in house by the BBC, maintain a separate mix bus for clean feeds. This approach is technically different, and arguably more flexible than most implementations of mix-minus, but the end result is the same.

References

Audio engineering
Broadcast engineering
Satellite broadcasting
Sound